Alejandra Noemí Reynoso Sánchez (born 21 April 1975) is a Mexican politician from the National Action Party. From 2009 to 2011 she served as Deputy of the LXI Legislature of the Mexican Congress representing Guanajuato.

References

1975 births
Living people
Politicians from Guanajuato
People from León, Guanajuato
Women members of the Chamber of Deputies (Mexico)
Members of the Chamber of Deputies (Mexico) for Guanajuato
National Action Party (Mexico) politicians
21st-century Mexican politicians
21st-century Mexican women politicians
Members of the Senate of the Republic (Mexico) for Guanajuato
Senators of the LXIV and LXV Legislatures of Mexico
Deputies of the LXI Legislature of Mexico
Deputies of the LXIII Legislature of Mexico
Women members of the Senate of the Republic (Mexico)